The following is a list of FCC-licensed radio stations in the U.S. state of New Jersey, which can be sorted by their call signs, frequencies, cities of license, licensees, and programming formats.

List of radio stations

Defunct
KE2XCC
W2XMN
WBGD
WDY
WFDS
WFMN
WHPH
WJDM
WJJZ
WJY (Hoboken, New Jersey)
WLOM
WMNJ
WPAT-FM (1949–1951)
WSRR
WWDX
WZFI-LP

References 

 
New Jersey
Radio